"In the Good Old Summer Time" is an American Tin Pan Alley song first published in 1902 with music by George Evans and lyrics by Ren Shields.

Background
Shields and Evans were at first unsuccessful in trying to sell the song to one of New York's big sheet music publishers. The publishers thought the topic of the song doomed it to be forgotten at the end of the summer season. Blanche Ring, who had helped Evans arrange the number's piano score, was enthusiastic about it and at her urging it was added to the 1902 musical comedy show "The Defender" she was appearing in. The song was a hit from the opening night, with the audience often joining in singing the chorus.

"In the Good Old Summer Time" was one of the big hits of the era, selling popular sheet music and being recorded by various artists of the day, including John Philip Sousa's band in 1903.  It has remained a standard often revived in the decades since.

The song appeared in many films, including the 1949 Judy Garland film named after it, In the Good Old Summertime. The book Elmer Gantry opens with the title character drunkenly singing the song in the saloon. It is also prominently featured in "The Picnic", an early Mickey Mouse cartoon from 1930.

The chorus is used with a slight twist in the "baby mine" lyric before resuming to the "tootsie-wootsie" lyric in a commercial for Off! bug spray that aired during the summer of 1975.

The song appeared in the episode titled Tipping the Scales of the hit PBS show Arthur, and featured in the 1930 Laurel and Hardy short Below Zero in ironical terms, sung during a snowstorm.

The song was sung during a wedding in the opening chapter of Upton Sinclair's novel "The Jungle".

The chorus is used with a slight twist in Baylor University's Alma Mater, "That Good Old Baylor Line."

The song appears in the 1978 episode of The Muppet Show performed by Pearl Bailey and Floyd Pepper, a member of Dr. Teeth and the Electric Mayhem.

Lyrics

The original publication includes extensive additional lyrics by Ren Shields that are seldom performed.

Notable recordings
J. W. Myers (1902)
William Redmond (1902)
Haydn Quartet (1903)
Sousa's Band (1903)
Harry Macdonough (1903)
The Andrews Sisters & Dan Dailey (1949)
Bing Crosby (1954) and for his album Seasons (1977) 
Connie Francis for the album Sing Along with Connie Francis (1961)
Les Paul and Mary Ford (1952) – this reached No 15 in the Billboard charts
Michael Holliday (1959)
Nat King Cole for the album Those Lazy-Hazy-Crazy Days of Summer (1963)
Kidsongs Kids (1997)

Footnotes

External links

Billy Murray's recording

1902 songs
1900s song stubs
Nat King Cole songs